Akatoreite ((Mn2+, Fe2+)9Al2[(OH)3|HSi4O13]) is a mineral found in New Zealand. The IMA symbol is Aka.

References

External links 

Mindat.org - Akatoreite
Webmineral.com - Akatoreite
Handbook of Mineralogy - Akatoreite

Sorosilicates
Triclinic minerals
Minerals in space group 2